Ayuub Abdi (born 8 October 1996) is a Somali professional footballer who plays as a midfielder for JäPS and the Somalia national team.

Club career
Abdi began his senior career with Viikingit in the Finnish Ykkönen, and moved to JäPS for the start of the 2021 season.

International career
Abdi debuted with the Somalia national team in a 3–0 2023 Africa Cup of Nations qualification loss to Eswatini on 23 March 2022.

References

External links
 
 
 JäPS profile

1996 births
Living people
Somalian footballers
Somalia international footballers
Association football midfielders
Kakkonen players
Ykkönen players
Somalian expatriate footballers
Somalian expatriates in Finland
Expatriate footballers in Finland